Molla Bjurstedt defeated Eleanor Goss 6–4, 6–3 in the challenge round to win the women's singles tennis title at the 1918 U.S. National Championships. The event was played on outdoor grass courts and held at the Philadelphia Cricket Club in Chestnut Hill, Philadelphia in the United States from June 17 through June 22, 1918. It was the last edition of the event with a challenge round.

Draw

Challenge round

Final eight

References

1918
June 1918 sports events
1918 in women's tennis
1918 in American women's sports
Women's Singles
Chestnut Hill, Philadelphia
1910s in Philadelphia
1918 in sports in Pennsylvania
Women's sports in Pennsylvania